Wilde River is a stream in Seekonk, Massachusetts and Pawtucket, Rhode Island. It begins at Bitersweet Pond in Seekonk and flows 5.2 miles to its confluence with the Ten Mile River in Pawtucket.

Crossings
Seekonk
Woodland Ave
Pine Street
Newman Ave (RT 152)

West Branch
West Branch Wilde River is a small stream in Seekonk that begins in an unnamed pond and flows 2 miles to its junction with  Wilde River.

Crossings
Seekonk
Pine Street
Tower Road

See also
List of rivers of Rhode Island

References
Maps from the United States Geological Survey

Rivers of Bristol County, Massachusetts
Seekonk, Massachusetts
Pawtucket, Rhode Island
Rivers of Providence County, Rhode Island
Rivers of Massachusetts
Rivers of Rhode Island
Tributaries of Providence River